is a former Japanese football player and manager. He played for the Japan national team.

Club career
Uemura was born in Yatsushiro on April 22, 1974. After graduating from Matsunaga High School, he joined J1 League side Sanfrecce Hiroshima in 1993. He broke into the first team in the first season. His first league appearance came on July 4, 1993 against Verdy Kawasaki at Kawasaki Todoroki Stadium. He scored his first professional goal on July 24, 1993 against Urawa Reds at Hiroshima Stadium. He played in many matches as defender from his first season, except at times when he was injured.

After 11 year's long service at Sanfrecce Hiroshima, he moved to Cerezo Osaka in 2004, then Tokyo Verdy (2005–2006). After a brief spell at YSCC Yokohama, he joined Rosso Kumamoto (later Roasso Kumamoto) in 2007. He damaged his knee ligaments three times and experienced seven operations. These injuries have affected his form. Uemura retired from professional football after the 2008 season.

National team career
He represented the Japan U-23 national team at the 1996 Summer Olympics. He played in 2 matches. He scored a goal in a group stage match against Hungary. Although Japan won 2 matches, Japan exited in the first round. Japan beat Brazil in their first game. It was known as the "Miracle of Miami" (マイアミの奇跡) in Japan.

In April 2001, Uemura was selected by the Japan national team. National team manager Philippe Troussier gave him his first full international cap on April 25 in a friendly against Spain in Córdoba. He was a member of the Japan team for the 2001 Confederations Cup. He played three games and Japan won second place. He played 4 games for Japan in 2001.

Coaching career
After the retirement, Uemura started coaching career at J2 League club Roasso Kumamoto in 2009. In 2013, he moved to J2 club Kamatamare Sanuki and served as coach under manager Makoto Kitano. However the club was relegated to J3 League end of 2018 season. In 2019, Uemura became a manager as Kitano successor.

Club statistics

National team statistics

Managerial statistics
Update; December 31, 2018

Honors and awards

Team Honors
 FIFA Confederations Cup Runners-Up: 2001

References

External links

 
 Japan National Football Team Database
 

1974 births
Living people
People from Yatsushiro, Kumamoto
Association football people from Kumamoto Prefecture
Japanese footballers
Japan international footballers
J1 League players
J2 League players
Japan Football League players
Sanfrecce Hiroshima players
Cerezo Osaka players
Tokyo Verdy players
YSCC Yokohama players
Roasso Kumamoto players
Japanese football managers
J3 League managers
Kamatamare Sanuki managers
Footballers at the 1996 Summer Olympics
Olympic footballers of Japan
2001 FIFA Confederations Cup players
Association football defenders